USS David W. Taylor (DD-551), a , was a ship of the United States Navy named for Rear Admiral David W. Taylor (1864–1940).

David W. Taylor was launched 4 July 1942 by Gulf Shipbuilding Corporation, Chickasaw, Ala., sponsored by Mrs. Imogene Taylor Powell, daughter of RAdm Taylor; and commissioned 18 September 1943.

History
David W. Taylor escorted a convoy of merchantmen from Charleston, South Carolina to Pearl Harbor arriving on 20 January 1944. Three days later she got underway to screen a support convoy to the Gilbert and Marshall Islands, returning to Pearl Harbor on 29 February. After escorting the aircraft carrier  to San Francisco, she sailed from Pearl Harbor 1 April to patrol in the Marshall Islands until 12 May. Returning to Pearl Harbor 18 May, she had training duties there until 7 June.

From 15 June to 4 August 1944 David W. Taylor sailed in the screen of escort carriers and fleet oilers supporting the Marianas operation. The destroyer joined the 3d Fleet 19 August, and sailed out of Manus screening the logistics group supporting the fast carrier task forces in their raids preparing for and accompanying the capture and occupation of the southern Palaus. With her base of operations at Ulithi from 29 October, David W. Taylor continued to screen the logistics group until 22 November when she joined the carriers for air attacks on Luzon in support of the invading troops on Leyte.

On 29 December 1944 she sailed from Ulithi for the air raids on the Bonins, bombarding Chichi Jima 5 January 1945. At 07:45 that day an underwater explosion, probably a mine, heavily damaged the ship and killed four men, but damage control brought her safely to Saipan 7 January under her own power. The ship continued to Hunter's Point Naval Shipyard, California, for an overhaul and repairs from 13 February to 7 May.

Sailing from San Diego 15 May 1945 David W. Taylor bombarded Emidj Island on 18 June on her way to Okinawa, arriving 30 June. The destroyer operated with a task group off Okinawa. After Japan surrendered, the ship arrived at Takasu, Kyūshū, 4 September, as escort for a convoy carrying occupation troops. She covered the landings at Wakanoura Wan and Nagoya until sailing 31 October for San Diego, arriving 17 November. David W. Taylor was placed out of commission in reserve there 17 August 1946.

Almirante Ferrandíz (D22) 

On 15 May 1957, the destroyer was leased to Spain where she served in the Armada Española as Almirante Ferrandíz (D22). Spain purchased the destroyer on 1 October 1972. The ship remained in service until 17 November 1987, when she was stricken and scrapped.

Honors
David W. Taylor received eight battle stars for World War II service.

References

External links 

Fletcher-class destroyers of the United States Navy
Ships built in Chickasaw, Alabama
1942 ships
World War II destroyers of the United States
Fletcher-class destroyers of the Spanish Navy